The third season of the American legal comedy-drama Suits was ordered on October 12, 2012. The third season originally aired on USA Network in the United States between July 16, 2013 and April 10, 2014. The season was produced by Hypnotic Films & Television and Universal Cable Productions, and the executive producers were Doug Liman, David Bartis and series creator Aaron Korsh. The season had six series regulars playing employees at the fictional Pearson Darby, later Pearson Darby Specter and Pearson Specter, law firm in Manhattan: Gabriel Macht, Patrick J. Adams, Rick Hoffman, Meghan Markle, Sarah Rafferty, and Gina Torres.

Overview
The series revolves around corporate lawyer Harvey Specter and his associate attorney Mike Ross, the latter practicing without a law degree.

Cast

Regular cast
 Gabriel Macht as Harvey Specter
 Patrick J. Adams as Mike Ross
 Rick Hoffman as Louis Litt
 Meghan Markle as Rachel Zane
 Sarah Rafferty as Donna Paulsen
 Gina Torres as Jessica Pearson

Recurring cast
 Abigail Spencer as Dana Scott
 Conleth Hill as Edward Darby
 Amanda Schull as Katrina Bennett
 Michelle Fairley as Dr. Ava Hessington
 Max Beesley as Stephen Huntley

Guest cast
 Gary Cole as D.A. Cameron Dennis
 Michael Phelps as himself
 Stephen Macht as Professor Gerard

Six actors received star billing in the show's first season. Each character works at the fictional Pearson Hardman law firm in Manhattan.  Gabriel Macht plays corporate lawyer Harvey Specter, who is promoted to senior partner and is forced to hire an associate attorney. Patrick J. Adams plays college dropout Mike Ross, who wins the associate position with his eidetic memory and genuine desire to be a good lawyer. Rick Hoffman plays Louis Litt, Harvey's jealous rival and the direct supervisor of the firm's first-year associates. Meghan Markle plays Rachel Zane, a paralegal who aspires to be an attorney but her test anxiety prevents her from attending Harvard Law School. Sarah Rafferty plays Donna Paulsen, Harvey's long-time legal secretary, confidant, and the only one at the firm who knows Mike never attended law school. Gina Torres plays Jessica Pearson, the co-founder and managing partner of the firm.

Michelle Fairley guest stars in multiple episodes as oil executive Dr. Ava Hessington, a high-profile client for the new Pearson Darby firm whose father has a past with Darby. Gary Cole reprises his Season 1 role as former Manhattan DA Cameron Dennis, now assigned as a special prosecutor in the Hessington case. Max Beesley is introduced as recurring character Stephen Huntley, Darby's right-hand man from the London office, who is considered the British Harvey. Swimmer Michael Phelps made a cameo appearance in the eleventh episode of the season. Stephen Macht, Gabriel Macht's father, guest stars as Professor Gerard in the season's twelfth episode.

Episodes

Ratings

References

External links 
Suits episodes at USA Network
List of Suits season 1 episodes at Internet Movie Database

03
2013 American television seasons
2014 American television seasons